Trimmer is a surname, and may refer to:

 Arthur Trimmer (1805-1877), early Western Australian settler
 Barry Trimmer, English scientist studying biomechanics
 Ed Trimmer (born 1952), American legislator in the Kansas House of Representatives
 Eric J. Trimmer (1923–1998), English general practitioner and medical writer
 George Trimmer (born 1996), English rugby player
 Sir Jon Trimmer (born 1939), "Jonty Trimmer", New Zealand ballet dancer
 Joshua Trimmer (1795–1857), English geologist born in Kent
 Joyce Trimmer (1927–2008), Canadian politician, first woman mayor of Scarborough, Ontario
 Lewis Trimmer (born 1989), English footballer
 Sarah Trimmer (1741–1810), English author of The Story of the Robins
 Tony Trimmer (born 1943), English racing car driver
 William Trimmer (1822–1867), winemaker and politician in South Australia